"At the End of a Bar" is a song by American country music singers Chris Young and Mitchell Tenpenny. The two artists co-wrote the song with Chris DeStefano. It is the fourth single from Young's eighth studio album Famous Friends.

Content
Young and Tenpenny wrote the song in February 2021 during an ice storm in Nashville, Tennessee. The title came from Tenpenny recalling how he met Young.

Writing for Taste of Country, Billy Dukes stated that "What makes this new pairing a bit better [than "Famous Friends", Young's collaboration with Kane Brown] is the combined power of the two vocalists. Like Young, Tenpenny's vocals come with R&B inflections; in fact, they're very similar singers, with the most obvious difference being that the younger of the two Nashville-area natives brings the treble, while the veteran brings the bass."

Charts

Weekly charts

Year-end charts

References

Male vocal duets
2021 singles
2021 songs
Chris Young (musician) songs
Mitchell Tenpenny songs
Songs written by Chris DeStefano
Songs written by Chris Young (musician)
RCA Records Nashville singles